Nathan Najar was rabbi at Constantine, Algeria, in the 15th century, son of Maimun Najar, and a contemporary of Solomon ben Simon Duran. The latter addressed to him a letter, which, together with Najar's answer, is found in Israel Akrish's Ḳobeẓ Wikkuḥim, and is reprinted, with corrections and index of passages, in Kerem Ḥemed, ix. 110 et seq.

Jewish Encyclopedia bibliography
Azulai, Shem ha-Gedolim, i.104, No. 32, Warsaw, 1876;
Fürst, Bibl. Jud. iii.12;
Grätz, Gesch. vii.502.

External links
Jewish Encyclopedia article on NAJARA

References 
 

Year of birth unknown
Year of death unknown
15th-century Algerian rabbis
People from Constantine, Algeria